This is a list of countries by garlic production from 2016 to 2020, based on data from the Food and Agriculture Organization Corporate Statistical Database. The total world production for garlic in 2020 was 28,054,318 metric tonnes, up slightly from 28,042,647 tonnes in 2019. China was by far the largest producer, accounting for nearly 74% of world production at 20,712,087 tonnes.

Production by country

>100,000 tonnes

10,000–100,000 tonnes

1,000–10,000 tonnes

<1,000 tonnes

Notes

References 

Garlic
Garlic
Garlic